Raymond "Broadway" Taylor (born 1910) was an American baseball catcher in the Negro leagues. He played from 1931 to 1944, playing mostly with the Memphis Red Sox.

References

External links

 and Baseball-Reference Black Baseball stats and Seamheads

1910 births
Kansas City Monarchs players
Memphis Red Sox players
Cleveland Buckeyes players
Louisville Black Caps players
Indianapolis ABCs (1938) players
St. Louis–New Orleans Stars players
Birmingham Black Barons players
St. Louis Stars (1939) players
Baseball players from Tennessee
Year of death missing
Baseball catchers